is a passenger railway station in located in the town of Katsuragi, Wakayama Prefecture, Japan, operated by West Japan Railway Company (JR West).

Lines
Nakaiburi Station is served by the Wakayama Line, and is located 53.0 kilometers from the terminus of the line at Ōji Station.

Station layout
The station consists of one side platform serving a single bi-directional track. There is no station building, and the station is unattended.

Adjacent stations

|-
!colspan=5|West Japan Railway Company

History
Nakaiburi Station opened on May 1, 1957. With the privatization of the Japan National Railways (JNR) on April 1, 1987, the station came under the aegis of the West Japan Railway Company.

Passenger statistics
In fiscal 2019, the station was used by an average of 344 passengers daily (boarding passengers only).

Surrounding Area
 Kihoku Branch Hospital, Wakayama Medical University
 Faculty of Agriculture, Wakayama Prefectural Agricultural University
 Wakayama Prefectural Kihoku Agricultural High School
 Hatsusakura Sake Brewery

See also
List of railway stations in Japan

References

External links

 Nakaiburi Station Official Site

Railway stations in Wakayama Prefecture
Railway stations in Japan opened in 1957
Katsuragi, Wakayama